The men's 800 metres event at the 1997 Summer Universiade was held at the Stadio Cibali in Catania, Italy, on 29 and 30 August.

Medalists

Results

Heats
Held on 29 August

Semifinals
Held on 30 August

Final
Held on 30 August

References

Athletics at the 1997 Summer Universiade
1997